{{DISPLAYTITLE:C4H6N4O2}}
The molecular formula C4H6N4O2 (molar mass: 142.12 g/mol, exact mass: 142.0491 u) may refer to:

 Divicine (2,6-diamino-4,5-dihydroxypyrimidine)
 Glycoluril

Molecular formulas